Microphysogobio vietnamica is a species of cyprinid fish endemic to northern Vietnam.

References

Microphysogobio
Fish described in 1978